Havelange Beni De Dieu Kei Wonflonhi Jean-Desire (born 30 December 2007), known as just Axel Kei, is an Ivorian professional footballer who plays as a striker for Major League Soccer club Real Salt Lake.

Club career

Kei joined the Real Salt Lake Academy in 2020 after transferring from the San Diego Youth Soccer Club, a youth organization run by the LA Galaxy. He won the MLS Next Cup U15 Golden Boot on 13 July 2021, in the academy's winning campaign at the MLS Next Cup. On 8 October 2021, he debuted with the Real Monarchs in a 0–0 USL Championship draw with Colorado Springs Switchbacks FC, coming on in the 61st minute. Kei's appearance at the age of  made him the youngest professional athlete in American team sport history.

Kei signed a Major League Soccer contract with Real Salt Lake on 14 January 2022. At 14 years and 15 days old, Kei became the youngest signing in MLS history, breaking the record Freddy Adu had held for eighteen years. Kei made his debut for the club on 22 September 2022 during a friendly against Mexican club Atlas FC. He entered the match at half-time as a substitute.

International career 
Born in the Ivory Coast, Kei was raised in Brazil, and moved to San Diego in 2017. He was called up to a training United States youth training camp in February 2019.

References

External links
 

2007 births
Living people
Footballers from Abidjan
Ivorian footballers
Association football forwards
LA Galaxy players
MLS Next Pro players
Real Salt Lake players
Real Monarchs players
USL Championship players
Homegrown Players (MLS)
Ivorian expatriate footballers
Ivorian expatriates in the United States
Ivorian expatriates in Brazil
Expatriate soccer players in the United States